Kade Gottlieb (born August 19, 1996), better known as Gottmik, is an American drag performer and make-up artist. He became the first openly trans man to compete on RuPaul's Drag Race, tying for 3rd place on the thirteenth season.

Early life
Gottmik was born in Arizona and later adopted by a conservative family in Scottsdale, and attended Notre Dame Preparatory High School. He began experimenting with drag at the age of eighteen. After high school, he pursued a career in the fashion industry by relocating to Los Angeles, where he transitioned and developed his cosmetics and drag skills. He earned a degree in product development from the Fashion Institute of Design & Merchandising.

Career

Make-up artistry 
Gottlieb is a drag performer and make-up artist. He has done makeup for Cindy Crawford, Todrick Hall, Paris Hilton, Heidi Klum, Adam Lambert, French Montana, and Tinashe, as well as Drag Race contestants Alaska Thunderfuck, Detox Icunt, Gia Gunn, Shangela, Violet Chachki, and Willam Belli. His work, described by Out Rose Dommu as "[ranging] from highly conceptual to urbane", has appeared in the magazines Flaunt, Nylon, and Paper. He did makeup for Amanda Lepore and Pabllo Vittar for their covers on Gay Times. In 2020, Gottlieb did Lil Nas X's makeup for Halloween, when he dressed as Nicki Minaj. He also did the makeup for the celebrities who were featured in Taylor Swift's 2019 single You Need to Calm Down.

RuPaul's Drag Race and subsequent tours 
In 2021, Gottmik became the first trans man to compete on RuPaul's Drag Race, appearing on the thirteenth season. He performed well in the competition, winning two challenges (the ball and the Snatch Game, performing as Paris Hilton), and ultimately reaching the top four alongside Kandy Muse, Symone, and Rosé. He was eliminated during the finale episode in a lip sync for your life to the song "Gimme More" against the season's eventual winner, Symone, ultimately tying with Rosé as second/third runner up.

After competing on Drag Race, Gottmik signed with Voss Events talent management, and will be traveling the United States with Voss' COVID-19 pandemic-compliant drive-in drag show, Drive 'N Drag Saves 2021. Gottlieb will also join Voss' 2022 European tour, Rupaul's Drag Race Werq the World tour.

In October 2021, Gottmik performed alongside fellow drag race alumni Violet Chachki, Alyssa Edwards, Aquaria, Jaida Essence Hall, Kandy Muse, Plastique Tiara, Rosé, and Kim Chi on Voss Event's Night of the Living Drag Halloween tour.

Media 
Gottmik launched a YouTube channel in January 2021. Gottlieb has also appeared on the Gigi Gorgeous, Pearl, James Charles and World of Wonder channels. Gottlieb was featured on the cover of Attitude for its April Style issue in 2021. Cosmopolitan invited Gottlieb to demonstrate how he transforms into Gottmik.

In a July 2021 interview with Entertainment Weekly, it was revealed that the producers of the 2022 remake of Hellraiser auditioned Gottlieb for the role of the film's most iconic character, Pinhead. Gottlieb had previously worn a black-and-white-themed runway look inspired by Pinhead in the season 13 finale of RuPaul's Drag Race.

In September 2021, Gottlieb started the YouTube and Podcast series No Gorge with fellow drag race alum Violet Chachki, where they discuss "all things fashion, life, and artistry." Gottmik is one of the most-followed queens of Drag Race, with more than 1.3 million Instagram followers as of October 2021.

In September 2022, Gottmik appeared in the music video for Sam Smith and Kim Petras' song Unholy alongside Violet Chachki. Gottmik and Violet Chachki also performed alongside Smith and Petras to the song Unholy at the 2023 Grammy Awards. 

Gottlieb will release his debut bookThe T Guide on May 16, 2023 through Penguin Random House. Co-written with Canadian beauty influencer Gigi Gorgeous, The T Guide will talk about the duo's "trans experiences and a celebration of gender expression – man, woman, nonbinary, and beyond".

Personal life
Out described Gottmik as "someone transmasculine who does high femme drag". Gottlieb uses she/her pronouns when portraying Gottmik, and he/him pronouns out of drag.

Gigi Gorgeous is among Gottmik's best friends; the two have appeared on magazine covers and launched merchandise together. Gigi also helped to fund Gottmik's chest reconstruction.

Gottmik identifies as pansexual.

Awards and nominations

|-
! scope="row" | 2021
| RuPaul's Drag Race
| People's Choice Award for The Competition Contestant of 2021
| 
|-
| 2022
| Himself
| The Queerty Groundbreaker Award
|
|-
| 2022
| Himself
| The WOWIE Award for Best Beauty Guru Award
|

Discography

Filmography

Television

Web series

See also

 Got Milk?
 Timeline of LGBT history, 21st century
 Timeline of transgender history

References

External links

 Kade Gottlieb at IMDb

Living people
American drag queens
American make-up artists
LGBT people from Arizona
LGBT people from California
People from Los Angeles
People from Scottsdale, Arizona
RuPaul's Drag Race contestants
Transgender men
Transgender drag performers
Pansexual men
1996 births